LCPC may refer to:
 Licensed Clinical Professional Counselor, a licensure for mental health professionals
 Laboratoire central des ponts et chaussées, a French scientific and technical research public establishment
 Languages and Compilers for Parallel Computing, a computer science conference